Jeanne Blackistone Dorsey Mandel (May 11, 1937 – October 6, 2001) was a First Lady of Maryland and second wife of former Maryland Governor Marvin Mandel, whom she had met in January 1963.  She was a native of Leonardtown, St. Mary's County, Maryland. Mrs. Mandel died from amyotrophic lateral sclerosis (ALS, also known as Lou Gehrig's disease).

Jeanne Blackistone Dorsey was elected as one of Leonardtown's Town Commissioners in 1968, the first woman elected to public office in St. Mary's County.  She served two consecutive two-year terms in that office while holding the position of Leonardtown's first female police commissioner.  She also served for two years as vice-chair of the Southern Maryland Municipal League and as a member of the Board of Parks and Recreation of St. Mary's County.

Her son, John Dorsey, is a former general manager of the Kansas City Chiefs and Cleveland Browns.

References 

1937 births
2001 deaths
American Jews
Converts to Judaism from Roman Catholicism
Deaths from motor neuron disease
Neurological disease deaths in Maryland
First Ladies and Gentlemen of Maryland
Local officeholders in Maryland
Women in Maryland politics
People from Leonardtown, Maryland
20th-century American politicians
20th-century American women politicians
21st-century American women